The 2005 United States Open Championship was the 105th U.S. Open, held June 16–19 at Pinehurst Resort Course No. 2 in Pinehurst, North Carolina.
  
Michael Campbell won his only major title, two strokes ahead of runner-up Tiger Woods; third-round leader and two-time U.S. Open champion Retief Goosen collapsed on the  It was the second of three U.S. Opens at the course, which first hosted in 1999, when Payne Stewart won his second U.S. Open four months before his death in an aviation accident. Six years was the shortest gap between U.S. Opens at the same site since 1946.

History of U.S. Open at Pinehurst No. 2 
It was only the second U.S. Open at Pinehurst, because of past concerns of high temperatures and its distance from a major populated area. At the first in 1999, Payne Stewart won his second U.S. Open (and third major) in one of the most remarkable U.S. Open victories ever. Stewart birdied 17 to take the lead and holed a  par putt on 18 in one of the most dramatic finishes ever. After helping the U.S. regain the Ryder Cup in late September, he died in a plane crash a month later at age 42. Stewart was honored at the 2005 edition with a silhouette of his 1999 victory pose on the flag of the 18th green, also captured in a bronze statue overlooking the 18th green.

Following a restoration by Bill Coore and Ben Crenshaw, the U.S. Open returned for a third time in 2014.

Course layout
Course No. 2

Field
1. Last 10 U.S. Open Champions
Ernie Els (4,9,10,16), Jim Furyk (16), Retief Goosen (9,10,13,16), Lee Janzen, Steve Jones, Corey Pavin, Tiger Woods (3,4,5,9,16)

2. Top two finishers in the 2004 U.S. Amateur
Luke List (a), Ryan Moore (a)

3. Last five Masters Champions
Phil Mickelson (9,16), Mike Weir (9,16)

4. Last five British Open Champions
Ben Curtis, David Duval, Todd Hamilton (9,16)

5. Last five PGA Champions
Rich Beem, Shaun Micheel, Vijay Singh (9,16), David Toms (9,16)

6. The Players Champion
Fred Funk (9,16)

7. The U.S. Senior Open Champion
Peter Jacobsen

8. Top 15 finishers and ties in the 2004 U.S. Open
Robert Allenby, Stephen Ames (9,16), Tim Clark (16), Chris DiMarco (9,16), Steve Flesch (9), Jay Haas (9,16), Tim Herron (16), Spencer Levin, Jeff Maggert, Shigeki Maruyama (9,16)

9. Top 30 leaders on the 2004 PGA Tour official money list
Stuart Appleby (16), Chad Campbell (16), K. J. Choi (16), Stewart Cink (16), Darren Clarke (10,16), John Daly (16), Carlos Franco, Sergio García (10,16), Mark Hensby (16), Zach Johnson (16), Jerry Kelly (16), Davis Love III (16), Kenny Perry (16), Rory Sabbatini (16), Adam Scott (16), Scott Verplank (16)

10. Top 15 on the 2004 European Tour Order of Merit
Ángel Cabrera (13,16), Paul Casey, Stephen Gallacher, Pádraig Harrington (16), David Howell (16), Miguel Ángel Jiménez (16), Thomas Levet, Graeme McDowell (16), Nick O'Hern (16), Ian Poulter (16), Lee Westwood (16)

11. Top 10 on the PGA Tour official money list, as of May 30
Luke Donald (16), Justin Leonard (16)

12. Winners of multiple PGA Tour events from April 28, 2004 through the 2005 Memorial Tournament
Bart Bryant

13. Top 2 from the 2005 European Tour Order of Merit, as of May 30

14. Top 2 on the 2004 Japan Golf Tour, provided they are within the top 75 point leaders of the Official World Golf Rankings at that time
Shingo Katayama, Toru Taniguchi

15. Top 2 on the 2004 PGA Tour of Australasia, provided they are within the top 75 point leaders of the Official World Golf Rankings at that time
Richard Green

16. Top 50 on the Official World Golf Rankings list, as of May 30
Thomas Bjørn, Fred Couples, Charles Howell III, Tom Lehman, Peter Lonard, Paul McGinley, Colin Montgomerie, Rod Pampling, Craig Parry

17. Special exemptions selected by the USGA
Nick Price

Sectional qualifiers
Japan: Steven Conran, Keiichiro Fukabori, Yang Yong-eun
England: Michael Campbell, Nick Dougherty, Simon Dyson, Peter Hanson, Peter Hedblom, Robert Karlsson, Søren Kjeldsen, José-Filipe Lima, Jonathan Lomas
United States
Tarzana, California: Scott Gibson (L), Nick Jones (L), Eric Meichtry (L), Michael Ruiz (L)
Littleton, Colorado: Wil Collins (L)
Tampa, Florida: Nick Gilliam (L), Josh McCumber (L), Lee Rinker (L)
Atlanta, Georgia: Aaron Barber (L), Derek Brown (L), Jason Gore (L), Matt Kuchar, Scott Parel (L), Casey Wittenberg
Lahaina, Hawaii: Pierre-Henri Soero (a,L)
Glen Ellyn, Illinois: Jim Benepe (L), Jerry Smith
Chevy Chase, Maryland: Paul Claxton (L)
Rockville, Maryland: Tommy Armour III, Craig Barlow, D. J. Brigman (L), Olin Browne, David Denham (a,L), James Driscoll, Steve Elkington, Matt Every (a,L), J. P. Hayes, David Hearn, Ryuji Imada, Clint Jensen (L), Franklin Langham, Ian Leggatt, John Mallinger (L), Rocco Mediate, David Oh (L), Michael Putnam (a,L), Rob Rashell, Brandt Snedeker (L), Omar Uresti (L), Lee Williams (a,L)
Kansas City, Missouri: Tom Pernice Jr.
Summit, New Jersey: Stephen Allan, Michael Allen, J. J. Henry, J. L. Lewis, Len Mattiace, Chris Nallen
Columbus, Ohio: Eric Axley, John Cook, Bob Estes, Robert Gamez, Bill Glasson, Brandt Jobe, Bernhard Langer, Frank Lickliter, Steve Lowery, Scott McCarron, John Merrick (L), Arron Oberholser, Joe Ogilvie, Geoff Ogilvy, Carl Pettersson, Ted Purdy, John Rollins, Sal Spallone (L), Bob Tway, Euan Walters
Galena, Ohio: Patrick Damron (L)
McKinney, Texas: Trip Kuehne (a), Kyle Willmann (L)
Snoqualmie, Washington: Troy Kelly (L)

Past champions in the field 

All seven former champions in the field made the cut.

Round summaries

First round 
Thursday, June 16, 2005

Qualifiers Olin Browne and Rocco Mediate had the first round lead at Pinehurst No. 2. While Masters champion Tiger Woods battled to an even-par 70 and two time winner Ernie Els ground out a 71. Retief Goosen launched his title defense with a three-birdie 68 for a three-way tie for third, 2004 Masters winner Phil Mickelson returned a 69 after holing a 20-foot birdie putt at the last and world number two Vijay Singh opened with a 70.

Second round 
Friday, June 17, 2005

Two-time champion Retief Goosen shared the lead in the U.S. Open second round after most of the field struggled on  Trailing by one at the start of the day, he carded an even-par 70 for 138, level with overnight leader Olin Browne and unheralded Jason Gore. Gore, who missed the cut in his only previous U.S. Open appearance in 1998, vaulted up the leaderboard late in the day with a five-birdie 67.  South Korea's K. J. Choi (70) and Australian Mark Hensby (68) were tied for fourth at one under.  World number two Vijay Singh was a further shot back in a four-way share of sixth after a second successive 70, alongside Spaniard Sergio García and New Zealand's Michael Campbell, who fired matching 69s, and England's Lee Westwood, after a 72.  Of the other big names, Tiger Woods was one over after a 71, while Phil Mickelson (77) and Ernie Els (76) just made the halfway cut which fell at eight-over 148. Nine players finished under par after the opening round but only five were still in red figures after day two.

Amateurs: Every (+8), Moore (+8), Kuehne (+10), List (+13), Denham (+14), Putnam (+15), Williams (+18), Soero (+20).

Third round 
Saturday, June 18, 2005

Retief Goosen took a three-shot lead after the U.S. Open third round on Saturday. The world number five recovered from a double-bogey six at the 13th with three birdies in the last five holes for 69 and 207 (–3), the only one to end the day in red figures. Tied for second at even-par 210 were Goosen's playing partner Olin Browne and Jason Gore, both carding 72s. Michael Campbell, another qualifier, registered a 71 to share fourth place at one-over 211 with Mark Hensby (72). David Toms, the 2001 PGA champion, was a further shot back after a 70 while Tiger Woods recorded a 72 to finish in a four-way tie for seventh at three over.

Final round 
Sunday, June 19, 2005

Michael Campbell held off a charging Tiger Woods to clinch his only major title by two shots on Sunday. The 36-year-old Campbell, four off the pace overnight, collected four birdies and three bogeys to close with a one-under-par 69, joint best of the day.  Woods, who had been chasing his 10th career major, rallied from a bogey-bogey start and reeled off four birdies in the last nine holes to secure second place with a matching 69.  He missed an eight-footer (2.5 m) for par on 16 and three-putted for bogey on 17. Sergio García and South Africa's Tim Clark both carded 70 to tie for third at five over, level with Mark Hensby who registered a 74. Retief Goosen, three strokes clear overnight, threw away his chance of a third U.S. Open title by dropping six shots in the first nine holes. Five more bogeys after the turn led to a dismal 81 (+11) and a share of 11th place at eight-over 288. Jason Gore ballooned to a 14-over 84 to tie for 49th while Olin Browne returned an 80 for a share of 23rd. David Toms shot a 77 to finish tied for 15th. Ernie Els fired his lowest score of the week, a level-par 70 earning him a share of 15th at nine-over 289 while Phil Mickelson returned a 74 to finish at 12 over in a tie for 33rd.

Amateurs: Matt Every (+11), Ryan Moore (+16)

Scorecard
Final round

Cumulative tournament scores, relative to par
{|class="wikitable" span = 50 style="font-size:85%;
|-
|style="background: Pink;" width=10|
|Birdie
|style="background: PaleGreen;" width=10|
|Bogey
|style="background: Green;" width=10|
|Double bogey
|style="background: Olive;" width=10|
|Triple bogey+
|}
Source:

References

External links 

USOpen.com – 2005

U.S. Open (golf)
Golf in North Carolina
U.S. Open
U.S. Open (golf)
U.S. Open (golf)
U.S. Open (golf)